Cantab may refer to:
 Cantabrian, a demonym for Canterbury, New Zealand
 Cantabrigian, a demonym for people from:
 Cambridge, England
The University of Cambridge
 Cambridge, Massachusetts
Harvard University
 Cantabrigian Rowing Club (Cantabs), a rowing club in Cambridge, England
 Cantabrigiensis (Cantab.), a postnominal suffix for a degree from Cambridge

Arts and entertainment
 Cantab (magazine), produced by University of Cambridge students from 1981 to 1990
  Roland "The Cantab" Ingestree, a fictional character in World of Wonders (novel)

Science and technology 
 Cambridge Neuropsychological Test Automated Battery (CANTAB)
 Jupiter Cantab, a Cambridge-based home computer company
 CANTAB, the codename for the code breaking British Bombe made by the British Tabulating Machine Company